The simple-station Marly is part of the TransMilenio mass-transit system of Bogotá, Colombia, opened in the year 2000, serves the neighborhood of Marly, Bogotá

Location

The station is located in northern Bogotá, specifically on Avenida Caracas, between Calles 49 and 51.

History

In 2000, phase one of the TransMilenio system was opened between Portal de la 80 and Tercer Milenio, including this station.

The station is named Marly due to its proximity to the Clinica de Marly, located in Chapinero. It serves the neighborhoods of the Quesada and Marly neighborhoods.

On March 9, 2012, protests lodged by mostly young children in groups of up to 200, blocked in several times and up to 3 hours in the trunk stations Caracas. The protests left destroyed and sacked this season of the system.

Station Services

Old trunk services

Main Line Service

Feeder routes

This station does not have connections to feeder routes.

Inter-city service

This station does not have inter-city service.

See also
Bogotá
TransMilenio
List of TransMilenio Stations

External links
TransMilenio
suRumbo.com

TransMilenio